Bohdan Zadura (born 18 February 1945 in Puławy) is a Polish poet, translator and literary critic.

Biography 
Zadura debuted in 1962 in "Kamena". He was editor of the Lublin literary magazine "Akcent", from 2004 editor of "Twórczość" / Warsaw. He is a translator of poetry from the English, Ukrainian and Hungarian. Zadura had a participation in the German-Polish poets steamer 1997. Translations Zaduras into German made by Henryk Bereska, Andreas Reimann, Dieter Kalka and Doreen Daume, into Ukrainian of Dmytro Pavlychko, Andriy Bondar, Mykola Rjabchuk and Andrij Ljubka. Zadura was an honorary citizen of Puławy (2010). For the band "Nocne życie / Nightlife" him of Silesius Award was in the category "książka roku / Book of the Year" award. In 1995 he was with Wacław Waldemar Michalski and Bogusław Wróblewski initiator establishing the East Cultural Foundation "Akcent". Since October 2004 Bohdan Zadura has been the editor in chief of the monthly literary journal Twórczość.

Works

Poetry 
 W krajobrazie z amfor, Czytelnik, Warszawa 1968
 Podróż morska, Czytelnik, Warszawa 1971
 Pożegnanie Ostendy, Czytelnik, Warszawa 1974
 Małe muzea, Czytelnik, Warszawa 1977
 Zejście na ląd, Czytelnik, Warszawa 1983
 Starzy znajomi, Czytelnik, Warszawa 1986
 Prześwietlone zdjęcia, Wydawnictwo Lubelskie, Lublin 1990
 Cisza, Wydawnictwo a5, Poznań 1994
 Cisza, Pomona, Wrocław 1996
 Noc poetów. Warszawa pisarzy, Centrum Sztuki – Teatr Dramatyczny, Legnica 1998
 Kaszel w lipcu, Pomona, Wrocław 2000
 Więzień i krotochwila, Zielona Sowa, Kraków 2001
 Poematy, Biuro Literackie, Legnica 2001
 Ptasia grypa, Biuro Literackie, Legnica 2002
 Kopiec kreta, Biuro Literackie, Wrocław 2002
 Stąd: wiersze puławskie, Towarzystwo Przyjaciół Puław, Puławy 2002
 Wiersze zebrane (3 tomy/3 volumes), Biuro Literackie, Wrocław 2005/2006
 Wszystko, Biuro Literackie, Wrocław 2008
 Nocne życie, Biuro Literackie, Wrocław 2010
 Zmartwychwstanie ptaszka (wiersze i sny) 2012

Prose 
 Lata spokojnego słońca, Lublin: Wydawnictwo Lubelskie, 1968
 A żeby ci nie było żal, Lublin: Wydawnictwo Lubelskie, 1972
 Patrycja i chart afgański, Warsaw: Czytelnik, 1976
 Do zobaczenia w Rzymie, Warszawa: Czytelnik, 1980
 Lit, Gdańsk: Marabut, 1997
 Proza tom 1. Opowiadania/Prosa volume 1, Tales, Breslau: Biuro Literackie, 2005
 Proza tom 2. Powieści/Prosa volume 2, Novels, Breslau: Biuro Literackie, 2006

Essay 
 Radość czytania (1980).
 Tadeusz Nowak (1981).
 Daj mu tam, gdzie go nie ma (1996).
 Między wierszami, Biuro Literackie, Legnica 2002
 Szkice, recenzje, felietony., Volume 1, Biuro Literackie, Wrocław 2007

Translations (selection) 
 D. J. Enright, Księga Fausta, Wydawnictwo Lubelskie, Lublin 1984.
 Tony Harrison, Kumkwat dla Johna Keatsa, PIW, Warszawa 1990.
 John Ashbery, No i wiesz (1993) (razem z Andrzej Sosnowski i Piotr Sommer).
 D. J. Enright, Rok akademicki (1997).
 Tony Harrison, Sztuka i zagłada, Biuro Literackie, Legnica 1999

External links 
 TV recording, literary news

References 

20th-century Polish poets
Polish translators
People from Puławy
Living people
1945 births
21st-century Polish poets
Polish male poets
20th-century Polish male writers
21st-century Polish male writers